The Bragg Islands are a small group of islands in Crystal Sound, about  north of Cape Rey, Graham Land. They were mapped from surveys by the Falkland Islands Dependencies Survey (1958–59) and from air photos obtained by the Ronne Antarctic Research Expedition (1947–48). The group was named by the UK Antarctic Place-Names Committee for Sir William H. Bragg, an English physicist who interpreted X-ray measurements to give the location of oxygen atoms in the structure of ice.

See also 
 List of Antarctic and sub-Antarctic islands

References 

Islands of Graham Land
Graham Coast